The EAR 29 class was a class of oil-burning  gauge  steam locomotives based upon the Nigerian Railways River class. Thirty-one were built for the East African Railways (EAR), in two batches, of 20 and 11, respectively, by North British Locomotive Company in Glasgow, Scotland. They were built to be gauge convertible to  gauge.

Class list
The numbers, build years and names of each member of the class were as follows:

See also
History of rail transport in Tanzania
Rail transport in Kenya
Rail transport in Uganda

References

Notes

Bibliography

External links

East African Railways locomotives
Metre gauge steam locomotives
NBL locomotives
Railway locomotives introduced in 1951
Steam locomotives of Kenya
Steam locomotives of Tanzania
Steam locomotives of Uganda
2-8-2 locomotives